Gerardo Buganza Salmerón (born 24 May 1956) is a Mexican politician affiliated with the National Action Party (PAN) who currently serves in the lower house of the Mexican Congress.

Buganza has served as federal deputy (1997–2000) and as senator (2000–2006). In 2004 he unsuccessfully ran for Governor of Veracruz representing the PAN; he lost against Fidel Herrera Beltrán.

In 2006 he was elected via the proportional representation to serve as federal deputy (2006–2009) representing Veracruz. He is President of the Committee on Foreign Affairs.

References

1956 births
Living people
Members of the Senate of the Republic (Mexico)
Members of the Chamber of Deputies (Mexico)
Mexican people of Italian descent
National Action Party (Mexico) politicians
Place of birth missing (living people)
21st-century Mexican politicians
Politicians from Veracruz
People from Córdoba, Veracruz
20th-century Mexican politicians
Universidad Iberoamericana alumni
Instituto Tecnológico Autónomo de México alumni